The Grand Final teams for all senior Victorian Football League premierships for the Richmond Football Club.

(Capt) = Captain, (C/C) = Captain/Coach (NS) = Norm Smith Medal

References 

 Hogan P: The Tigers Of Old, Richmond Football Club, Melbourne 1996

Richmond Football Club
Australian rules football-related lists